The 2014 Aleutian Islands earthquake occurred on 23 June at 11:53 HDT (UTC-9) with a moment magnitude of 7.9 and a maximum Mercalli intensity of VIII (Severe).

Earthquake

The earthquake was initially reported as 8.0  before it was downgraded to 7.9. The rupture was on a normal fault, at ~107 km depth. Based on the geometry of the slab, and the relative movement of the tectonic plates, the slip vector is likely to have been oblique down-dip towards the ESE. The fault plane appears to be oblique, striking NW-SE and cutting steeply into the subducting slab.

Tsunami
A tsunami warning was issued, but was soon downgraded to a tsunami advisory for much of the Aleutian Islands; however, the hypocenter was too deep to generate a tsunami that would affect the Pacific basin. A small non-destructive tsunami was generated, with heights of 17 cm on Amchitka.

See also
 List of earthquakes in 2014
 List of earthquakes in Alaska
 List of earthquakes in the United States

References

Sources

External links

  M7.9 Rat Islands Earthquake of June 23, 2014  Alaska Earthquake Center (archived)

2014 earthquakes
2014 in Alaska
Aleutian 2014
2014 tsunamis